Connecticut's 149th House of Representatives district elects one member of the Connecticut House of Representatives. It encompasses parts of Greenwich and Stamford and has been represented by Democrat Rachel Khanna since 2023.

List of representatives

Recent elections

2022

2020

2018

2016

2014

2012

References

149